This article lists the national football squads for the 1990 FIFA World Cup final tournament held in Italy, between 8 June and 8 July 1990. Each country's final squad consisted of 22 players and had to be confirmed by 29 May.

Replacement of injured players was permitted during the tournament at the discretion of FIFA. Two goalkeepers (for Argentina and England) were allowed to replace their injured counterparts under this ruling. Players marked (c) were named as captain for their national squad. Number of caps counts until the start of the World Cup, including all pre-tournament friendlies. A player's age is also at the start of the tournament.

Group A

Austria
Head coach: Josef Hickersberger

Czechoslovakia
Head coach: Jozef Vengloš

Italy
Head coach: Azeglio Vicini

Note: with the exception of the goalkeepers, who were assigned the traditional shirt numbers for the role (1, 12 and 22) the Italian team was numbered alphabetically within their respective positions: Defenders (from 2 to 8), Midfielders (from 9 to 14) and Forwards (from 15 to 21).

United States
Head coach: Bob Gansler

Group B

Argentina
Head coach: Carlos Bilardo

 *Following a rupture of goalkeeper Pumpido's tibia and fibula, the Argentine team was authorized to replace him with Comizzo, who joined the team as third goalkeeper.

Cameroon
Head coach:  Valery Nepomnyashchy

Romania
Head coach: Emerich Jenei

Soviet Union
Head coach: Valeriy Lobanovskyi

Group C

Brazil
Head coach: Sebastião Lazaroni

Costa Rica
Head coach:  Bora Milutinović

Scotland
Head coach: Andy Roxburgh

The Scotland squad was numbered according to the number of caps that each player had won at the time.
The exception to this was Goalkeeper Jim Leighton who was given the traditional number 1 jersey.

Sweden
Head coach: Olle Nordin

Group D

Colombia
Head coach: Francisco Maturana

United Arab Emirates
Head coach:  Carlos Alberto Parreira

West Germany
Head coach: Franz Beckenbauer

Yugoslavia
Head coach: Ivica Osim

Group E

Belgium
Head coach: Guy Thys

South Korea
Head coach:  Lee Hoe-taik

Spain
Head coach: Luis Suárez

Uruguay
Head coach: Óscar Tabárez

Group F

Egypt
Head coach: Mahmoud Al-Gohari

England
Head coach: Bobby Robson

 * David Seaman was originally selected, but after the first game in Italy, he had to pull out of the squad due to a thumb injury and was replaced by Dave Beasant.

Netherlands
Head coach: Leo Beenhakker

Republic of Ireland
Head coach:  Jack Charlton

Notes
Each national team had to submit a squad of 22 players. All the teams included 3 goalkeepers, except Colombia and Republic of Ireland who only called two.

References
 Planet World Cup website
 weltfussball.de 

Squads
FIFA World Cup squads